Red Earth, White Earth is a novel by Will Weaver, about conflicts between white farmers and native Ojibwes in northern Minnesota.  The story follows Guy Pehrsson, a California computer entrepreneur who returns to Minnesota twelve years after he ran away at age eighteen.  His childhood blood brother, Tom Little Wolf, is now a tribal lawyer intent on reclaiming farmlands mishandled in past treaties, lands which include the Pehrsson's homestead.  The novel explores the friendship between the two throughout their boyhood and into adulthood, and finally, to their reunion.

The novel was published in 1986 by Simon & Schuster, and was produced as a CBS television movie in 1989, directed by David Greene and starring Timothy Daly, Richard Farnsworth, Billy Merasty and Alberta Watson.

1986 American novels
American novels adapted into films
American young adult novels
Farms in fiction
Novels about race and ethnicity
Novels set in Minnesota
Simon & Schuster books